This is a list of all combat and combat support regiments and corps of the Sri Lanka Army.

Armoured
 Sri Lanka Armoured Corps

Infantry

Regular Army
 Sri Lanka Light Infantry
 Sri Lanka Sinha Regiment
 Gemunu Watch 
 Gajaba Regiment 
 Vijayabahu Infantry Regiment 
 Mechanized Infantry Regiment

Volunteer Force
 Sri Lanka Rifle Corps 
 Sri Lanka National Guard

Special Forces
 Commando Regiment
 Special Forces Regiment

Support Arms and Services

Support Arms
 Sri Lanka Artillery
 Sri Lanka Engineers
 Sri Lanka Signals Corps

Services
 Military Intelligence Corps  
 Engineer Services Regiment 
 Sri Lanka Army Service Corps 
 Sri Lanka Army Medical Corps
 Sri Lanka Army Ordnance Corps 
 Sri Lanka Electrical and Mechanical Engineers 
 Sri Lanka Corps of Military Police 
 Sri Lanka Army General Service Corps 
 Sri Lanka Army Women's Corps
 Sri Lanka Army Corps of Agriculture and Livestocks 
 Sri Lanka Army Pioneer Corps

Disbanded
Ceylon Rifle Regiment
Ceylon Mounted Rifles
Ceylon Planters Rifle Corps
Colombo Town Guard
Rajarata Rifles
Ruhunu Regiment
National Service Regiment 
Post and Telegraph Signals 
President's Guard
Ceylon Railway Engineer Corps

References

Sri Lanka Army

Army